Dil Maya Karki (born 5 October 1988) is a sprinter from Nepal. She represented her country in the 400 metres at the 2015 World Championships in Beijing without advancing from the first round. She represented her country at the 2014 Asian Games.

International competitions

Personal bests
200 metres – 27.03 (+1.2 m/s, Incheon 2014)
400 metres – 60.30 (Incheon 2014)
400 metres – 59.9h (Guwahati 2016)

References

Nepalese female sprinters
Living people
Place of birth missing (living people)
1988 births
World Athletics Championships athletes for Nepal
Athletes (track and field) at the 2014 Asian Games
Asian Games competitors for Nepal
21st-century Nepalese women